General Cyrus Trapaud (18 August 1715 – 3 May 1801) was a British Army officer.

Trapaud was born in Dublin, the son of a Huguenot refugee family, and a relative of Marshal Turenne. 

He served in the Buffs (Royal East Kent Regiment), accompanying the regiment to the Netherlands in 1742. As an ensign at the Battle of Dettingen, 1743, he reputedly saved the life of King George II, whose horse had bolted, and received a promotion as a reward. Trapaud was also present at the battles of Battle of Fontenoy, Falkirk and Culloden.

In 1760, Trapaud was made a colonel in the 70th Regiment of Foot; he was promoted to major general in 1762, lieutenant general in 1772, and full general in 1783. He was Colonel of the 70th regiment from 1760 to 1778,  when he was transferred as Colonel to the 52nd (Oxfordshire) Regiment of Foot.  

On his death in 1801, he was succeeded as Colonel by Sir John Moore.

Trapaud was married to Catherine Plaistow, daughter of General Plaistow, in 1751. Her portrait was also painted by Sir Joshua Reynolds.  Copies of these, by Edward Fisher, are held by the National Portrait Gallery. Trapaud's brother was deputy Governor of Fort Augustus.

References

1715 births
1801 deaths
Military personnel from Dublin (city)
52nd Regiment of Foot officers
British Army generals
Buffs (Royal East Kent Regiment) officers
British Army personnel of the War of the Austrian Succession
British Army personnel of the Jacobite rising of 1745